"Sex Music" is a song by American singer Tank. It was written by Tank along with Robert Newt, Jerry "Texx" Franklin, Harvey Mason, Jr., Kristina Stephens, and J. Valentine for his fourth album Now or Never (2010), while production was helmed by Mason and Song Dynasty. It was released by Atlantic Records as the album's lead single on June 29, 2010 and peaked number 29 on the US Billboard Hot R&B/Hip-Hop Songs chart.

Music video
The video premiered on Vibe.com on August 5, 2010. It was directed by Colin Tilley.

Track listing
Digital download
 "Sex Music" – 3:43

Credits and personnel
Credits lifted from the liner notes of Now or Never.

Durrell "Tank" Babbs – writer
David Boyd – recording assistant
Danny Cheung – recording engineer
Michael Daley – recording assistant
Jerry "Texx" Franklin – writer
Jesus Garnica – mixing assistant
Dabling Harward – recording assistant

Andrew Hey – recording engineer
Jaycen Joshua – mixing engineer
Harvey Mason, Jr. – producer, writer
Robert Newt – writer
Song Dynasty – producer
Kristina Stephens – writer
J. Valentine – writer

Charts

Release history

References

2010 singles
Tank (American singer) songs
Music videos directed by Colin Tilley
Songs written by J. Valentine
2010 songs
Songs written by Harvey Mason Jr.
Atlantic Records singles
Songs written by Tank (American singer)